The flag of Baton Rouge is the city flag of Baton Rouge, capital city of Louisiana. It has a red field with a small shield and cursive text reading "Baton Rouge". The current flag was adopted in 1995 by the city council, replacing an older flag that had been in use since 1968.

Design
The flag has a field of crimson representing the red-colored poles erected by Native Americans along the Mississippi River from which the city's name is derived. The crest on the lower left uses the red, white and blue, representing the colors of the United States. The upper left of the shield is the fleur-de-lis representing France, the upper right is a castle taken from the flag of the Kingdom of Castile, representing Spain, and the lower portion is the pre-1801 Union Flag of the Kingdom of Great Britain. The coat of arms encompasses the emblems of the three European countries whose flags have flown over Baton Rouge. The name "Baton Rouge" in white appears prominently on the field of crimson.

History
The city adopted its first flag on December 11, 1968, by recommendation of a flag committee established by mayor W. W. Dumas. It consisted of an emerald green field with the city seal in the center, which included a castle for Spain, a lion for England, and the fleur-de-lis for France. The flag was replaced by the current design on December 13, 1995.

See also 
 Flags of the United States
 Union Jack

References

External links
 

Flag
Baton Rouge
Flags introduced in 1995